These are the RPM magazine Dance number-one hits of 1988. No chart was published from January 1980 until September 3, 1988.

Chart history

See also
List of number-one dance hits (Canada)

References

External links
 Read about RPM Magazine at the AV Trust
 Search RPM charts here at Library and Archives Canada

 
Dance
Dance
RPM electronic dance music chart
Dance music